This is a timeline documenting events in Jazz in the year 1946.

Events
 The Jazz Journal is established in London by Sinclair Traill, originally under the title Pick Up.
 Armstrong wins the Esquire Gold award for Vocalist.

Album releases

Artistry in Rhythm – Stan Kenton

Standards

Births 

 January
 4 — Susannah McCorkle, American singer (died 2001).
 4 — André Ceccarelli, French drummer and composer.
 12 – George Duke, American keyboard pioneer, composer, singer and producer (died 2013).
 16 – Spike Wells, English drummer and priest.
 20 – John Sheridan, American pianist.
 24 – Marion Cowings, American singer and university teacher.
 30 – Michael S. Smith, American drummer and percussionist (died 2006).
 31 – Terry Kath, American guitarist and vocalist, Chicago (died 1978).

 February
 20 – J. Geils, American jazz and blues guitarist in The J. Geils Band (died 2017).
 21 – Terry Bradds, American guitarist.
 22 – Tom Grant, American pianist and vocalist.
 24 – Tullio De Piscopo, Italian drummer and singer.
 28
 Mike Renzi, American pianist, arranger and musical director.
 Pierre Dørge, Danish guitarist, bandleader, and composer.

 March
 1 — Vinny Golia, American composer and multi-instrumentalist.
 11 – Patty Waters, American singer.
 19 – Jack Schaeffer, American musician, recording artist, producer and arranger.
 22
 Jerry Jemmott, American bass guitarist.
 Melvin Sparks, American guitarist (died 2011).

 April
 13 – Al Green, American singer.
 14 – Knut Kristiansen, Norwegian pianist and orchestra leader.
 16 – Ivar Antonsen, Norwegian pianist.
 24 – Stafford James, American bassist.
 25 – Digby Fairweather, British cornettist and broadcaster.
 29 – Humphrey Carpenter, English musician, biographer, and writer (died 2005).
 30 – Joel Futterman, American pianist and curved soprano saxophonist.

 May
 2 — Joel Forrester, American composer and pianist.
 5 — Jack Walrath, American trumpeter and arranger.
 10 – Jimmy Ponder, American guitarist (died 2013).
 12 – Rudolf Tomsits, Hungarian trumpeter, flugelhornist, and composer (died 2003).
 22 – Martin Kratochvíl, American jazz rock musician.
 23 – Don Moye, American percussionist and drummer.
 27 – Niels-Henning Ørsted Pedersen, Danish upright bassist (died 2005).
 28 – Claudio Roditi, Brazilian trumpeter (died 2020).

 June
 7 — Zbigniew Seifert, Polish violinist (died 1979).
 16 – Tom Harrell, American trumpet and flugelhorn player.
 17 – B. J. Cole, English pedal steel guitarist.
 18 – William Hooker, American drummer and composer.
 24 – Clint Houston, American upright bassist (died 2000).
 29 – Ken Hyder, Scottish fusion drummer.

 July
 3 — John Klemmer, American saxophonist, composer, songwriter, and arranger.
 6 — Toquinho, Brazilian singer and guitarist.
 11 – Kimiko Itoh, Japanese singer.
 17
 Ellade Bandini, Italian drummer.
 Per Henrik Wallin, Swedish pianist and composer (died 2005).
 20 – Bob McHugh, American pianist, composer, and educator.
 23 – Khan Jamal, American vibraphone and marimba player.
 24 – Al Lowe, American video game designer, programmer, and musician.

 August
 6 — Allan Holdsworth, English guitarist (died 2017).
 14 – Bjørn Kruse, Norwegian saxophonist and composer.
 27 – Roland Prince, Antiguan guitarist (died 2016).
 31
 Cooper-Moore, American pianist, composer, and instrument builder/designer.
 Su Cruickshank, Australian singer (died 2009).

 September
 4 — Dave Liebman, American saxophonist and flautist.
 18 – Benjamín Brea, Venezuelan woodwind player (died 2014).
 23 – Duster Bennett, British singer and guitarist, Fleetwood Mac (died 1976).
 26 – Ted Greene, American guitarist (died 2005).
 28 – Helen Shapiro, English singer.

 October
 1 — Dave Holland, English upright bassist, composer, and bandleader.
 3 — Mike Clark, American drummer.
 11 – Daryl Hall, American singer, keyboardist, guitarist, songwriter, and producer.
 12 – Daryl Runswick, English composer, arranger, musician, producer, and educationalist.
 15
 Bo Stief, Danish bassist, composer and arranger.
 Palle Danielsson, Swedish upright bassist.
 22 – Jac Berrocal, French trumpeter, singer, and composer.

 November
 4 — Billy Hancock, American singer, guitarist, bassist, and multiinstrumentalist (died 2018).
 7 — Raymond Harry Brown, American composer, arranger, and trumpeter.
 18 – Bennie Wallace, American tenor saxophonist.
 20 – Bruno Tommaso, Italian upright bassist and composer.
 23 – Ray Drummond, American upright bassist and teacher.
 25 – Guilherme Franco, Brazilian percussionist (died 2016).

 December
 7
 Phil Treloar, Australian drummer, percussionist and composer.
 Trent Kynaston, American saxophonist, music educator and composer.
 12 – Bruce Ditmas, American drummer and percussionist.
 14 – Jerome Cooper, American drummer (died 2015).
 16 – René McLean, American saxophonist and flutist.

 Unknown date
 Atilla Engin, Turkish-American drummer.
 Carter Jefferson, American tenor saxophonist (died 1993).
 Douglas Ewart, Jamaican multi-instrumentalist and instrument builder.
 Frank Gibson, Jr., New Zealand drummer and drum tutor.
 Peter Langston, American guitarist and computer programmer.
 Riccardo Zegna, Italian pianist.
 Roger Turner, English percussionist.

Deaths 

 January
 30 – Fred Beckett, American trombonist (born 1917).

 February
 15 Putney Dandridge, American bandleader, jazz pianist and vocalist (born 1902).

 July
 20 – Tricky Sam Nanton, American trombonist with the Duke Ellington Orchestra (born 1904).

 September 
 16 Mamie Smith, American vaudeville singer, dancer, pianist and actress (born 1883).

 October
 3 – James Tim Brymn, American conductor, arranger, composer, and pianist (born 1881).

 Unknown date
 Joseph Petit, American jazz trombonist (born 1873).
 Manuel Perez, New Orleans jazz cornetist and bandleader (born 1871).

See also
 1940s in jazz
 List of years in jazz
 1946 in music

References

Bibliography

External links 
 History Of Jazz Timeline: 1946 at All About Jazz

Jazz
Jazz by year